Coal Hill School is a fictional school in the British science fiction television series Doctor Who and its spin-off series Class. It is located on Coal Hill Road in the Shoreditch area of London.

The school first appeared in the first episode of Doctor Who, "An Unearthly Child", in 1963, and has had numerous appearances ever since. Several major characters in the two shows' history are depicted as students or faculty members at Coal Hill. In the original 1963–89 run of Doctor Who, Ian Chesterton and Barbara Wright are teachers of student Susan Foreman, while in the 50th Anniversary Special "The Day of the Doctor" and in the 2005 revival's eighth and ninth series, Clara Oswald teaches English classes. All of the main characters of Class are students at the Academy, along with one teacher, Miss Quill; the school is renamed Coal Hill Academy in the series.

Appearances

"An Unearthly Child" (1963)
The Coal Hill School is the setting of the first episode of Doctor Who, "An Unearthly Child", first broadcast in November 1963. In the episode, two teachers at the school, science teacher Ian Chesterton and history teacher Barbara Wright, discover that one of their students, Susan Foreman, is a time traveller who has been attending the school as her grandfather, the First Doctor (the central character of the series), makes repairs on their time machine, the TARDIS. The school was a constructed set shot inside Studio D at Lime Grove Studios.

Writer Kim Newman interprets Coal Hill School as a secondary modern school, which he notes is unusual for British children's television in the early 1960s; educational settings in children's television of the time were more commonly "fantasy fee-paying schools" like Billy Bunter's Greyfriars School. However, Tat Wood and Lawrence Miles interpret the lack of uniforms at Coal Hill as an indication that it is an early comprehensive school.

Newman stresses how important the grounded normality of the "unlovely" school was for Doctor Whos fantastic premise:

Ian wears the school neck-tie which, despite being shown only in monochrome, is described in The Web Planet as being black with thin green diagonal stripes.

Remembrance of the Daleks (1988)
The school appeared in the series again almost twenty-five years later in the October 1988 story Remembrance of the Daleks. In this serial that kicked off its 25th anniversary season, the Seventh Doctor returns to 1963 to complete some business left unfinished by his hurried departure on the previous occasion. The school is a featured location, as a group of Daleks set up a base there while attempting to locate a powerful Time Lord artifact, the Hand of Omega, the Doctor had previously hidden in the area. In this story the school sign states it is located in Coal Hill Road, Shoreditch. In reality, St. John's School in Hammersmith was used as Coal Hill School in location filming.

Tat Wood notes that in this story, which most viewers interpret as being set shortly after the events of "An Unearthly Child", Coal Hill School has a school uniform. From this and other evidence in Remembrance of the Daleks, such as the fact that it is broad daylight at 5:15 pm, Wood hypothesizes that Remembrance is actually set in the summer of 1963, prior to the events of "An Unearthly Child", with the school's uniforms being phased out in the autumn term.

Australian scholar Marcus K. Harmes notes the tension in Remembrance of the Daleks between the presumed nostalgia of bringing back Coal Hill School from Doctor Whos first episode and the story's unflattering portrayal of 1963 London as "a racist, bigoted society", thus placing Doctor Whos origins "in a period with ugly undercurrents". (Harmes contrasts this "transgressive" approach towards Doctor Whos past with the uncritical nostalgia displayed in stories such as Attack of the Cybermen.)

The pupils wear a different school tie from that worn by Ian. In Remembrance, it has alternating red and dark blue diagonal broad stripes.

"The Day of the Doctor" (2013)
Coal Hill School appeared again twenty-five years later, in the 50th anniversary special "The Day of the Doctor". The Eleventh Doctor's companion Clara Oswald is shown to have become an English teacher at the school. The school sign names the Headmaster as W. Coburn, making reference to Anthony Coburn, who wrote An Unearthly Child, and lists I. Chesterton as the head of governors. Reviewers saw the Coal Hill sequence in "The Day of the Doctor" as a pleasant nostalgic touch or a "delightful Easter Egg", though Ian Sadler of online magazine Hi! felt the school was included "just so fans could be teased with an irrelevant scene." The Coal Hill sequence in "The Day of the Doctor" was filmed at Gladstone Primary School, Whitchurch Road, Cardiff.

Series 8 (2014)

In the 2014 series of Doctor Who, Coal Hill School became a recurring location. The first episode of the series, "Deep Breath", included a brief flashback to Clara's first day as a teacher at Coal Hill. In the second episode, "Into the Dalek", viewers were introduced to Danny Pink, a maths teacher at Coal Hill School and romantic interest for Clara played by Samuel Anderson. Danny is a recurring character in series 8. Popular press and fan reviewers alike suggested that the presence of two Coal Hill School teachers may be a deliberate echo of the series' origins. Writer Steven Moffat said when introducing Danny Pink:

When asked about the significance of Coal Hill School, Anderson said,

The episode "Time Heist" included a brief scene between Danny and Clara set in the school. The subsequent episode, "The Caretaker", was almost completely set in and around Coal Hill School, and involved Clara struggling to keep her life with the Twelfth Doctor separate from her personal and professional life. Den of Geek reviewer Simon Brew said that in "The Caretaker", Coal Hill School "gets woven even more into the fabric of Doctor Who". Writing for The Guardian, Dan Martin said, "Ofsted would be plunged into crisis if the true nature of Shoreditch’s Coal Hill school ever became apparent," and suggested that it was telling that the Doctor had not informed Clara of his own history with Coal Hill. Patrick Mulkern of the Radio Times noted that, although not explicitly explained in the episode, the Skovox Blitzer (the episode's threat) is drawn to Coal Hill School because of the Doctor's past visits there. Three schools were used for Coal Hill filming locations for "The Caretaker": Gladstone Primary School, Cardiff (again), Holton Primary School in Barry, and Tonyrefail School. The episode "Kill the Moon" included scenes set at Coal Hill in its beginning and end, and in its primary setting on the Moon, the episode involves the Doctor taking Clara's student Courtney Woods to the year 2049 to be the "first woman" on it. "In the Forest of the Night" featured a group of Year 8 students from Coal Hill on a school trip with Clara and Danny, and also included two short flashback scenes set in the school. In "Death in Heaven", students of the school can be seen with a Cyberman on Missy's mobile gadget when confronting her rival and former friend the Doctor.

Series 9 (2015)
In "The Magician's Apprentice" (2015), Clara is shown teaching English to a class, when the airborne planes stop. Mr Dunlop tells Clara there is a call from UNIT and she leaves via her motorbike. At the end of "The Woman Who Lived", Clara reveals to the Doctor that Evie (a student) got an A in a project which he helped her with. She shows a selfie with her and Evie on her phone to the Doctor; with Ashildr (Maisie Williams) in the background.

Class (2016)
Coal Hill is the setting for the Doctor Who spin-off, Class. In this show, it has become Coal Hill Academy with the official address being given in  "For Tonight We Might Die" and "Nightvisiting" as Foreman Street, Shoreditch E2 7QE. In the opening episode, the Twelfth Doctor, unable to be everywhere at once, chooses the alien teacher Miss Quill and five of her sixth form students, April, Ram, Tanya, Matteusz and Charlie (who is also an alien) to defend Coal Hill from any menaces coming through tears in space time located at the newly renovated school. The names of "Parson. H.", "Foreman. S.", "Pink. R. D." and "Oswald. C." are displayed on a plaque of the deceased and missing at the school. The headteacher is shown now to be Mr Armitage — a character who appeared in numerous episodes of Doctor Who Series 8. He is skinned alive and subsequently killed by a dragon in "The Coach with the Dragon Tattoo". He is succeeded by Dorothea Ames in the episode "Co-Owner of a Lonely Heart", who offers to return Miss Quill's free will in exchange for Miss Quill's help, and in the following episode "Brave-ish Heart", Dorothea explains that the group that took over Coal Hill as an academy, EverUpwardReach, installed a Board of Governors to keep it safe and "ready", watching how Quill and the others fared on their own. In "The Lost", Dorothea further explains that the Governors gather knowledge in preparation for "the arrival". The Governors order a Weeping Angel to kill Dorothea after she fails to predict that Charlie would use an alien weapon to destroy the Shadow Kin race.

Sets built at Roath Lock studios in Cardiff were used in studio recordings of the Academy.

Other appearances and references
Sam Jones, a companion from the Eighth Doctor Adventures spin-off novels, also attended Coal Hill School.

References

External links 

Doctor Who locations
Fictional schools
London in fiction
Shoreditch